Damai LRT station is an elevated rapid transit station in Kuala Lumpur, Malaysia, forming part of the Kelana Jaya line (formerly known as PUTRA). The station was opened on 1 June 1999, as part of the line's second segment from Pasar Seni to Gombak. It is one of the 13 stations between Masjid Jamek and Gombak.

Location

Damai station is located in the central core of Datok Keramat village, in east Kuala Lumpur, along the northern banks of the Klang River and the Ampang–Kuala Lumpur Elevated Highway, thus facing Jalan Datok Keramat (Malay; English: Datok Keramat Road) to the north. The station is named after the enclosed Datok Keramat precinct of Damai, which encompasses the southern half of Datok Keramat south from the Klang River and is linked to the station via a pedestrian bridge crossing the river. The Urban Transformation Centre Keramat and Food Court is directly situated across the station from Jalan Datok Keramat, being connected via linkbridge.

The station is one of three Kelana Jaya Line stations serving the Datok Keramat area, the other two consisting of Dato' Keramat station and the Jelatek station towards Gombak. Damai is currently intended to serve the east side of Datok Keramat closely connected to Jalan Tun Razak (Tun Razak Road) to the east via adjoining Jalan Gurney (Gurney Road) and Jalan Semarak (Semarak Road), and eastern Damai.

Damai station is also the first above-ground station after Ampang Park station towards Gombak.

See also

 Rail transport in Malaysia

References

Kelana Jaya Line
Railway stations opened in 1998